Diving into the Unknown (original title Takaisin pintaan) is a 2016 Finnish film directed by Juan Reina.

Four Finnish cave divers face their worst nightmare when two of their friends drown deep inside an underwater cave in Norway. When the official recovery operation is called off by the Norwegian and British authorities after being deemed too risky, the friends set out on a secret mission to retrieve the bodies themselves.

The film premiered at the 2016 Docpoint Helsinki on 27 January 2016 and had its international premiere in Visions du Réel film festival, Switzerland in April 2016.

Synopsis

The film opens with footage of a group of Finnish divers attempting to swim through a cave system in Plurdalen, Norway. The dive requires them to cut through ice and swim down into the Pluragrotta cave to depths of over  before emerging on the other side in a dry cave. During the course of the dive, two of the team, Jari Huotarinen and Jari Uusimaki, died.

An international team of rescue divers attempted to retrieve the bodies but ultimately abandoned the attempt due to the dangers involved, and the caves were closed by the police. Despite this, the survivors of the original diving team planned a covert but well-supported return expedition to retrieve the bodies of their friends. They were accompanied by the documentary crew that had originally begun filming their attempt to swim through the cave, and the dives were recorded on helmet-worn cameras.

The retrieval attempt was ultimately successful and both bodies were brought to the surface. The Norwegian police decided not to press charges against the divers.

References

External links
 

2016 films
2016 documentary films
Documentary films about underwater diving
Finnish documentary films
2010s Finnish-language films